Diabolik is an Italian action crime film directed by the Manetti Bros. and based on the comic series of the same name.

It is the second film adaptation of Diabolik, after Mario Bava's Danger: Diabolik in 1968.

A sequel titled Diabolik - Ginko Attacks! (Diabolik - Ginko all'attacco!) was released on November 17, 2022.

Plot
Legendary thief Diabolik plans his next heist: stealing a valuable diamond from heiress Eva Kant, who is dating the deputy minister of justice, Giorgio Caron. Using one of his trademark masks to impersonate his nemesis, Inspector Ginko, Diabolik tricks Eva into revealing which hotel she will be staying at. He makes another mask to pose as one of the wait staff assigned to her room, and quickly locates the hidden safe where the diamond is kept. However, upon seeing Eva, he becomes infatuated with her.

Diabolik sneaks into Eva's room to steal the diamond, but Eva walks in on him, and he has no choice but to hold her at knifepoint. Eva calmly reveals that she doesn't have the diamond, having already sold it to a dealer in South Africa, and Diabolik leaves. The next day, he returns and unmasks himself in front of Eva; disgusted by the lecherous Giorgio, she starts an affair with him. Unbeknownst to Diabolik, his girlfriend Elisabeth, from whom he has hidden the truth about who he really is, accidentally uncovers his secret hideout. Ginko is notified and arranges a sting operation, resulting in Diabolik's arrest.

At trial, Diabolik is convicted and sentenced to be beheaded via guillotine. When Eva learns of his fate, she has Giorgio use his influence to arrange a clandestine meeting in Diabolik's cell. Once the guards leave, Eva incapacitates Giorgio and Diabolik questions him to learn where he is keeping a file containing information as to Eva's unsavory past, which he had been using to blackmail her. He then dons a mask of Giorgio's face and puts on his clothes to escape, while a drugged Giorgio is fitted with a Diabolik mask and executed in his place. Ginko figures out the deception in time to stop Diabolik from retrieving the file; one of his officers finds it instead.

Needing money to flee the country, Diabolik targets a bank holding expensive jewelry and watches. He has Eva impersonate a rich widow named Ms. Morel to rent a vault. This enables her to learn about the bank's security features so Diabolik can figure out how to bypass them by flooding the bank and using diving equipment to steal the jewels and watches. Ginko, using his knowledge of Diabolik's modus operandi, is able to determine his escape route and briefly holds him at gunpoint before Eva distracts him and he is overpowered by Diabolik. The two make their getaway on a motorboat while Ginko can only watch in defeat.

Sometime later, Diabolik and Eva are on a yacht. To cement their new partnership, he presents her with a gift: the diamond.

Cast

Release
Originally set to be released in theatres on 31 December 2020, it was postponed to 16 December 2021 due to the COVID-19 pandemic in Italy.

On February 2023, the directors stated that Kino Lorber acquired the movie trilogy's rights fot the United States.

Sequel 
A sequel titled Diabolik - Ginko Attacks! (Diabolik - Ginko all'attacco!) was released on November 17, 2022, also directed by the Manetti Bros. While Miriam Leone and Valerio Mastandrea reprise their role, the sequel stars Giacomo Gianniotti as Diabolik instead of Luca Marinelli.

References

External links

Burglary in film
Films based on Italian comics
Films directed by the Manetti Bros.
Films postponed due to the COVID-19 pandemic
Films set in the 1960s
2020s Italian-language films
Italian crime action films
2021 crime action films
2020s Italian films